Timiryazevo may refer to

Timiryazevo, Kaliningrad Oblast, an inhabited locality in Kaliningrad Oblast, Russia
Timiryazevo, Vladimir Oblast, Russia
Timiryazevo, Kamensky District, Voronezh Oblast, Russia
Timiryazevo, Novousmansky District, Voronezh Oblast, Russia
Timiryazevo, North Kazakhstan, Kazakhstan

See also
Timiryazev (disambiguation)

ru:Тимирязево